Far Cry is a series of first-person shooter video games.

Far Cry may also refer to:

 Far Cry (album), a 1960 album by jazz musicians Eric Dolphy and Booker Little
 "Far Cry" (Marvin Gaye song), 1981
 "Far Cry" (Rush song), 2007
 Far Cry (video game), the first in the series
 Far Cry (film), a 2008 German film adapted from the video game
 A Far Cry (film), a 1959 documentary about displaced persons after the Korean War
 The Far Cry, a 1926 American silent epic drama film
 A Far Cry, a Boston-based chamber orchestra
 "A Far Cry", a song from the 1992 album Aqua by Asia
 The Far Cry, a 1951 crime novel by Fredric Brown